Lasse Sørensen (born 21 October 1999) is a Danish footballer who plays as a midfielder for EFL League One club Lincoln City.

Career

Stoke City
Sørensen was born in Vejen and began his career with the youth team of Danish Superliga side Esbjerg fB before moving to English side Stoke City in January 2016. He joined up with the first team after impressing manager Paul Lambert playing for the club's under-23 side towards the end of the 2017–18 campaign.

Sørensen made his professional debut on 13 May 2018 in a Premier League match against Swansea City, he played 76 minutes as already relegated Stoke won 2–1. Sørensen signed a long-term contract with Stoke in July 2018. His only appearance in the 2018–19 season came against Preston North End on 26 January 2019. 

Sørensen made no appearances in the 2019–20 season until March 2020 when the league was suspended due to the COVID-19 pandemic. During the lockdown Sørensen recorded high running stats tracked on GPS training-vests. His work was rewarded with a start in the first match of the restart away at Reading on 20 June 2020. He made five more appearances towards the end of the campaign as Stoke finished in 15th position.

On 4 September 2020 Sørensen joined EFL League One side Milton Keynes Dons on loan for the 2020–21 season. He made his debut for the club on 5 September 2020 in a 1–0 EFL Cup first round home defeat to Coventry City. Whilst on loan, on 8 December 2020 Sørensen scored his first professional goal in a 6–0 EFL Trophy Round of 32 home victory over Norwich City U21. Sørensen made 34 appearances for the Dons as they finished in 13th position.

Lincoln City
On 23 July 2021, Sørensen joined EFL League One club Lincoln City for an undisclosed fee, signing a long-term contract with the Imps. He would make his Lincoln City debut on the opening day of the season against Gillingham. He would score his first goal for the club on 2 October 2021, at home to Plymouth Argyle.

Career statistics

References

External links
 
National team profile

Danish men's footballers
1999 births
Living people
Esbjerg fB players
Stoke City F.C. players
Milton Keynes Dons F.C. players
Lincoln City F.C. players
Premier League players
Association football midfielders
English Football League players